Jeffers is a surname. Notable people with the surname include: 

 Alex Jeffers, American author
 Alexis Jeffers (born 1968), St. Kitts and Nevis politician
 Anne Burton Jeffers (1851 - 1946), American librarian
 Audrey Jeffers (1898–1968), Trinidadian social worker and politician
 Brent Jeffers, American football coach
 Charles Jeffers (1871–1939), American sports shooter
 Ed Jeffers (1921–2010), American football player
 Francis Jeffers (born 1981), English football player
 Grace Jeffers, American writer and artist
 Hamilton Jeffers (1893–1976), American astronomer
 Henry W. Jeffers (1871–1953), American dairyman and politician
 James D. Jeffers (1798–1831), commonly known as Charles Gibbs, American pirate
 Jim Jeffers (1912–1992), Australian rules footballer
 John Jeffers (born 1968), English footballer
 Juliette Jeffers, American actress
 Kelvin Jeffers (born 1963), Nevisian cricketer
 Lamar Jeffers (1888-1983), American politician
 Leslie Jeffers (1910–2000), English wrestler
 Maurice Jeffers (born 1979), American basketball player
 Neil Schyan Jeffers (born 1977), Antigua and Barbudan footballer
 Oliver Jeffers (born 1977), Northern Irish illustrator
 Othyus Jeffers (born 1985), American basketball player
 Patrick Jeffers (born 1973), American football player
 Rachel Jeffers (born 1985), American rower
 Robinson Jeffers (1887–1962), American poet
 Rusty Jeffers (born 1964), American bodybuilder
 Ryan Jeffers (born 1997), American baseball player
 Shane Jeffers (born 1981), Kittian cricketer
 Shaun Jeffers (born 1992), English footballer
 Sue Jeffers (born 1956), American restaurateur and politician
 Susan Jeffers (1938–2012), American psychologist and author
 Terence Jeffers-Harris (born 1988), Canadian football player
 Wellington Jeffers (1814–1896), Canadian teacher and minister
 William Nicholson Jeffers (1824–1883), American naval officer
 W. W. Jeffers (1852–1936), Canadian baseball umpire

See also 
 Jeffries, Jeffreys, Jefferies
 Jefferson (surname)

Surnames from given names